Racine carrée (stylised √) is the second studio album by Belgian musician Stromae. It was released digitally on 16 August 2013 and three days later physically in France and Belgium.
Stromae expressed his desire to incorporate Caribbean and African musical influences along with his signature 1990s-inspired dance beats. The album, recorded in an attic, explores themes as diverse as alienation from social networks, relationship issues, discrimination, cigarettes and lung cancer, AIDS and absent father figures. Prior to its official release and afterwards, Racine carrée received critical acclaim for its thoughtful lyrics and gained comparisons to fellow Belgian recording artist Jacques Brel.

The album was a commercial success across Western Europe, including non-francophone countries. Racine carrée topped the charts in France, Belgium, Switzerland, the Netherlands and Italy, as well as reaching the top ten in Canada, and the top forty in Germany. In his native Belgium, it remained at the top the charts for multiple weeks and been certified twelve times platinum by the BEA. In France, the album has been certified quadruple diamond by the SNEP and become one of the highest-selling albums in recent years after amassing over one million copies sold four months after its release. Racine carrée yielded three chart-topping singles: "Papaoutai", "Formidable" and "Tous les mêmes".

Chart performance 
In France, Racine carrée debuted at number one with one of the year's strongest first-week sales: 80,882 units, of which 55,597 were physical copies and 25,285 downloads. The opening week numbers were higher than the 75,000 copies his previous album, Cheese, had sold since its release. The following week, the album sold 50,901 copies but was replaced at the top of the chart by the second volume of tribute album Génération Goldman, which sold 59,274 units. By the end of September and after only six weeks of release, Racine carrée had crossed the 300,000 mark and spent five non-consecutive weeks at number one. In the last week of October, the album surpassed Daft Punk's Random Access Memories as the best selling album of 2013; up to that point the former had sold 475,500 copies while the latter had amassed 469,700 units. In its eighteenth week on the chart, just before Christmas, Racine carrée remained at number one for a sixteenth non-consecutive week at the top with its biggest weekly sales and the second-best weekly score of 2013, 182,034 units, just behind the 195,013 copies Random Access Memories sold in its first week of availability. This allowed it to cross the million mark in just four months; the last album to sell over one million copies was Adele's 21 (2011), which took eleven months.

In francophone Europe, Racine carrée also experienced massive success. In his native Belgium, Stromae's second album opened at number one in both Flanders and Wallonia. In the former, Racine carrée spent 17 non-consecutive weeks at number one; while in the latter, it remained at the top for 26 non-consecutive weeks. In late December, the album was certified seven times platinum by the Belgian Entertainment Association, denoting shipments of over 140,000 copies in the country. Additionally, Racine carrée finished the year as the best-selling album in both Flanders and Wallonia. In Switzerland, the album also debuted at number one and held the top spot for four additional weeks. In French-speaking Romandie, the album spent fourteen non-consecutive weeks at number one and remained in the top three for several weeks after its release in late August. In addition, Racine carrée has been certified 5× platinum by the Swiss branch of the International Federation of the Phonographic Industry, denoting shipments of 75,000 units. In Canada, the album debuted within the top ten and remained in the chart for only three weeks.

Success was not limited to francophone countries; the album also sold well in Germany and the Netherlands. In Germany, Racine carrée debuted just outside the top twenty in the main albums chart and at the top of the digital albums chart. In the Netherlands, the album debuted at number sixteen; the following week it climbed five positions to reach number eleven, its highest chart rank up to that point. After falling below the top forty and reaching positions as low as fifty-seven for two weeks, it eventually rebounded and entered the top ten for the first time in mid-December. The album later peaked within the top three. According to MegaCharts, the album finished the year as the fifty-eighth highest-selling album in the Netherlands.
In Austria, the album did not reach the chart but sold constantly in the lower sales regions, eventually reaching gold.

Singles 
Racine carrée produced six singles:
 "Papaoutai" was released as the lead single in mid-May 2013. The autobiographical song tells the story of a young boy who is looking for his father. Stromae revealed that his father was killed during the 1994 Rwandan genocide. The music video shows him adopting the style and pose of a 1940s mannequin, representing the absent father and the young version of him trying to interact with the mannequin. The single became an instant hit in France and Wallonia, where it spent multiple weeks at number one; it also reached the top ten in Switzerland and Luxembourg as well as non-francophone countries or regions such as the Czech Republic, Dutch-speaking Flanders in Belgium, Germany and the Netherlands.
 "Formidable" was released as the follow-up single to "Papaoutai" in June 2013. The music video, filmed in the streets of Brussels, was particularly notorious for displaying Stromae wandering at the Louise/Louiza tram and metro station during the daybreak, where the singer appears to be completely drunk. The song tells the story of a drunk man recently separated from his girlfriend. It eventually topped the charts in France and the Dutch-speaking and French-speaking regions of Belgium, reached the top five in the Netherlands, the top twenty in Switzerland and the top forty in Austria and Germany.
 "Tous les mêmes" was officially released as the third single from the album in December 2013. The song displays the various stereotypical traits and behaviours of men and women alike. The music video for the single shows Stromae half-dressed as a woman and acting annoyed by the attitude of men and what they do; to further aid the interpretation, green lighting effects are used for male Stromae and pink ones for female Stromae. The single became Stromae's third consecutive number one from Racine carrée in France and Wallonia, while reaching the top five in Flanders and charting in the Netherlands and Switzerland.
 "Ta fête" was released on 3 February 2014. The track served as the anthem for the Belgium national football team during the 2014 World Cup in Brazil.
 "Ave Cesaria" was released on 21 July 2014. The track honours Cesária Évora, one of Stromae's favourite artists who died in 2011.
 "Carmen" was released on 20 March 2015. The track was inspired by L'amour est un oiseau rebelle, an aria from the 1875 opera Carmen by Georges Bizet, hence the song's title.
 "Quand c'est?" was released on 14 September 2015.

Track listing

Charts

Weekly charts

Year-end charts

Certifications

Release history

References

External links
  

2013 albums
Stromae albums
French-language albums